Ian Duncan may refer to:
 Ian Duncan (rally driver) (born 1961), rally driver from Kenya
 Ian Duncan, Baron Duncan of Springbank (born 1973), British politician
 Ian Duncan (businessman), businessman active in the Australian resources sector
 Ian Duncan (actor), South African actor
 Ian Duncan (oncologist) (born 1943), British gynecological oncologist
 Ian Duncan (Community), a character in Community

See also 
 Iain Duncan, Canadian ice hockey player and coach
 Iain Duncan Smith, UK politician